Anselmus de Boodt or Anselmus Boëtius de Boodt (Bruges, 1550 -  Bruges, 21 June 1632) was a Flemish humanist, mineralogist, physician and naturalist. Along with the German known as Georgius Agricola, de Boodt was responsible for establishing modern mineralogy. De Boodt was an avid mineral collector who travelled widely to various mining regions in Germany, Bohemia and Silesia to collect samples. His definitive work on the subject was the Gemmarum et Lapidum Historia (1609).

De Boodt was also a gifted draughtsman who made many natural history illustrations and developed a natural history taxonomy.

Early life
De Boodt descended from an aristocratic family.  His ancestors had come from Dortrecht in the 13th century.  His father Anselmus de Boodt (1519-1587) was a renowned broker who also provided overseas insurance coverage.

De Boodt studied artes at the University of Louvain.  He left to study canonical and civil law at the University of Orléans from the end of 1572.   After completing his studies, he went to study for a while in Padua where his presence is confirmed in 1576. In 1579 he was appointed to the city council of Bruges and was involved in the financial administration of the city of Bruges. However, he had to leave the city after the Calvinists took power.

At the imperial court

Court physician

De Boodt went to Bohemia where in 1583 he was appointed the personal physician of Wilhelm Rosenberg, an important diplomat and military leader of Bohemia, who lived in the Renaissance Castle of Český Krumlov in southern Bohemia. During his stay at the court of Rosenberg, he likely studied medicine at Heidelberg where he met the Swiss doctor of medicine Thomas Erastus.

In 1584 he was appointed canon of St. Donat's Church in Bruges. He held the position until 1595 without leaving Prague.

In 1586 de Boodt returned to Padua to continue his medicine study and obtained a doctorate the next year.

In 1587 the Flemish doctor and pioneering botanist Carolus Clusius left the imperial botanical garden of Emperor Rudolph II in Prague, de Boodt took over his position. De Boodt was also appointed the medical court doctor of the Emperor.

Various works
De Boodt prepared a Theatrum Instrumentarum Mechanicorum for Emperor Rudolph II (unpublished), which described a wide range of scientific instruments. When the court engraver Martino Rota died in 1583 de Boodt obtained an engraving licence in 1588 to complete the third part of Rota's Last Judgement (Albertina, Vienna).

When the Flemish court historian Jacobus Typotius died after completing the second part of his Symbola Divina et Humana, a collection of emblems and imprese (the first volume had appeared in Prague with engravings by Aegidius Sadeler), de Boodt completed the third and most voluminous part. The book appeared in 1603 and was reprinted at least 10 times up to 1972 (Academia, Graz).

Natural history studies
De Boodt also made many watercolours of native and exotic animals and plants.  He filled twelve volumes with 728 illustrations of quadrupeds, reptiles, birds, fish, insects and plants.  He thus aimed to depict all creatures of the natural world as his compatriot Joris Hoefnagel who was also working at Rudolph II's court had done earlier in his series of the Four Elements.  De Boodt's volumes can be regarded as a paper museum.

He developed a taxonomy and standardisation, which he added in many languages to his drawings.  These drawings predate the Academy of the Lynxes around Galileo Galilei for which usually primacy of such material is claimed.  De Boodt made most of the drawings himself but also engaged the services of other artists such as his compatriot Elias Verhulst from Mechelen. This Historia Naturalis remained in the hand of his heirs until 1844 and was partially published in 1989 (De Albums van Anselmus De Boodt, door M.C. Maselis, A. Balis, R. Marynissen; Lannoo Tielt; The Boodt Watercolours, 1999).

Geological studies

The principal assignment of de Boodt was the study and cataloguing of all known rocks and minerals.   He summarized his work in the Gemmarum et Lapidum Historia (The History of Gems and Stones), the first volume of which appeared in 1609 and was dedicated to the emperor.  The original text was published in Latin in 1609 in Hanoviae (Hanau, now Germany).  Two further editions in Latin were published in Leiden, the Dutch Republic, in 1636 and in 1647. These were organized by a physician of Leiden, Adriaan Toll, a commentator of the works of Galenus. The book was reprinted many times and translated into French.

The book was used for many centuries for its information on the splitting of diamonds, how to recognize fake gems, colour-fast mixes for painters, exploration sites for geologists, the hardness of rocks and the health benefits of certain minerals.

The first part of the book gives an account of the various causes of minerals.  De Boodt's views on this were influenced by earlier scholastic authors and the Greek philosopher Aristotle.   He was still able to arrive at a unique account for the causes of the formation of minerals and several of his ideas became well accepted throughout the seventeenth century. The book contains important contributions to the theory of colour.

The publication of the Gemmarum et Lapidum Historia ensured de Boodt's European reputation and he could afford to live in luxury.  He still decided to leave the imperial court after the death of Rudolf II in 1612.

Return to Bruges
He returned to Bruges in 1614.  Here he remained active as a physician, painted and performed on string instruments songs from his own Luteboec (Book of the Lute).  He composed various literary works in his native Dutch as a member of the local Chamber of Rhetoric.  He translated the Consolatione Philosophiae of Boethius into Dutch verse and for the youth he published spiritual liedekens (songs) such as De Baene des Deugds  (The Way of Virtue) (1624) and De Baene des Hemels ende der Deughden (The Way of Heaven and the Virtues) (Nicolaes Breyghel, 1628).

He compiled the first herbal book in Bruges with sixty plates, published posthumously by his young friend Vredius in 1640 under the title Anselmi Boëtii de Boot I.C. Brugensis & Rodolphi II. imp. Roman. medici a cubiculis florum, herbarum, ac fructuum selectiorum icones, & vires pleraeq. hactenus ignotae.

Anselm de Boodt died on 21 June 1632 in Bruges.

Selected works
Gemmarum et lapidum historia : qua non solum ortus, natura, vis & precium, sed etiam modus quo ex iis olea, salia, tincturae, essentiae, arcana & magisteria arte chymica confici possint, ostenditur : opvs principibvs, medicis, chymicis, physicis, ac liberalioribus ingeniis vtilissimum : cum variis figuris, indiceq. duplici & copioso, Anselmus Boetius de Boot, Hanoviae, Typ. Wechelianis apud C. Marnium et heredes J. Aubrii, 1609
Le Parfaict joaillier ou l'histoire des pierreries sont amplement descrites, Ans. Boece de Boot, Lyon, Huguetan, 1644
Gemmarum et lapidum historia : quam olim edidit Anselmus Boetius de Boot ... / Postea Adrianus Tollius ... recensuit; figuris melioribus, & commentariis pluribus illustravit, & indice auxit multo locupletiore, de Boodt Anselmus Boëtius 1550–1632. -- Tollius Adrianus, 17th century, ed. -- De Laet Joannes 1581-1649—Theophrastus 372-287 BC, Lugduni Batavorum, ex officina Ioannis Maire, 1647.
Anselmi Boëtii de Boot I.C. Brugensis & Rodolphi II. imp. Roman. medici a cubiculis florum, herbarum, ac fructuum selectiorum icones, & vires pleraeq. hactenus ignotae. E bibliotheca Olivari Vredi I.C. Brugensis, 1640
Symbola Diuina & Humana Pontificvm Imperatorvm Regvm. Accessit breuis, & facilis Isagoge Iac. Typotii. Ex Mvsaeo Octavii De Strada. 3. Symbola Varia Diversorvm Principvm. Cvm Facili Isagoge D. Anselmi De Boodt Brvgensis Sac. Caes. Malavlae Medici, Francofvrti: Schönwetter; 1652

References

External links

Galileo Project on Anselmus de Boodt
Curiosities from Bruges and Cologne
Anselmus de Boodt (1609) Gemmarum et lapidum historia - digital facsimile from the Linda Hall Library

Flemish scientists
Flemish botanists
Flemish Renaissance painters
Physicians of the Habsburg Netherlands
Physicians of the Spanish Netherlands
Natural history illustrators
Mineralogists
Flemish illustrators
Botanical illustrators
Flemish geologists
1550 births
1632 deaths
Scientists from Bruges
Physicians from Bruges